"Come Over" is a song recorded by American singer Aaliyah, featuring backing vocals from Tank. It was written by Phalon "Jazze Pha" Alexander, Johntá Austin, Bryan-Michael Cox, and Kevin Hicks, while being produced by Alexander, Cox and Hicks. The song was originally recorded for Aaliyah's eponymous third and final studio album (2001) but was not included on its track listing. When it was left unused, "Come Over" was given to American duo Changing Faces, who included their version on their third studio album Visit Me (2000).

Following Aaliyah's August 25, 2001 death, Aaliyah's version of "Come Over" was included on her posthumous compilation album I Care 4 U (2002). Critically acclaimed, it was released as the album's fourth and final single on April 29, 2003, by Blackground Records and Universal Records. A moderate commercial success, "Come Over" peaked at number 32 on the US Billboard Hot 100.

Writing and recording
"Come Over" was written by Johntá Austin, Bryan-Michael Cox, Kevin Hicks and Phalon "Jazze Pha" Alexander, while being produced by Cox, Hicks and Alexander. It was originally recorded for Aaliyah's eponymous third and final studio album (2001) at the Sony Music Studios in New York City, but did not make the album's final cut. When the song was left unused, it was given to American duo Changing Faces, who included their version on their third studio album Visit Me (2000).

Release
"Come Over" was serviced to rhythmic contemporary and urban contemporary radio in the United States on April 29, 2003, as the fourth and final single from I Care 4 U, by Blackground Records and Universal Records.

In August 2021, it was reported that Aaliyah's recorded work for Blackground (since rebranded as Blackground Records 2.0) would be re-released on physical, digital, and, for the first time ever, streaming services in a deal between the label and Empire Distribution. I Care 4 U, including "Come Over", was re-released on October 8.

Critical reception
Ross Scarano from Complex praised Aaliyah's vocal performance on "Come Over", saying: "Aaliyah's voice did longing so well. The lightness of her touch when stretching out and fluttering the final syllable of a word like 'over' in 'Come Over' is too pretty". Scarano also felt that certain parts within the song, such as the dying cellphone bit, were amusing. Bianca Gracie from Fuse praised Aaliyah's vocals saying, "Her unique falsetto from her teen days is still there, but after a few years of experience and relationships it sounds stronger and more pure". Caroline Sullivan from The Guardian stated "the improvised final bars of Come Over show just how effortless a soul vocalist she was, and point to what might have been". In contrary, Sal Cinquemani from Slant Magazine reviewed the song negatively, calling it "lackluster". In a retrospective review, Billboard praised Aaliyah's delivery on the song and felt that it will remain an after-hours anthem for years to come".

Track listing
Promotional CD single
"Come Over" (album version) – 3:56

Credits and personnel
Credits are adapted from the liner notes of I Care 4 U.
 Aaliyah – lead vocals
 Johntá Austin – writing
 Bryan-Michael Cox – production, writing
 Kevin Hicks – production, writing
 Jazze Pha – production, writing
 Acar Keys – engineering, mixing
 Tank – backing vocals

Charts

Weekly charts

Year-end charts

Release history

References

External links
 
 Official website

2003 singles
Aaliyah songs
Songs written by Bryan-Michael Cox
Songs written by Johntá Austin
2002 songs
Song recordings produced by Bryan-Michael Cox
Blackground Records singles